Pittsford Mendon High School is a public high school in suburban Rochester, Monroe County, upstate New York. It is one of two high schools in the Pittsford Central School District, the other being Pittsford Sutherland High School. Pittsford Mendon is located at 472 Mendon Road (from which the school gets its name) in the town of Pittsford, near the town of Mendon, New York.

As of the 2012–13 school year, the school had an enrollment of 1,018 students and 82 classroom teachers (on an FTE basis), for a student-teacher ratio of 14.23.

In 2017, Pittsford Mendon High school had 1,013 students enrolled, 77 full time teachers, had a 13:1 student-teacher ratio, had 51% female students and 49% male students.

Awards and recognition
Pittsford Mendon was ranked 71st in the country (a Gold Medal School) by US News & World Report in its 2013 high school rankings.

In 2017, Pittsford Mendon High school was ranked #86 in the National Rankings and earned a gold medal. In New York alone, Pittsford Mendon High school was ranked #14. These rankings are based on the schools performance on state-required test scores and how well they prepared students for college.

In 2007, the school was ranked 94th nationwide in Newsweek's Top 1,300 High School's in the United States. Rankings are calculated using "a ratio that takes the number of Advanced Placement, Intl. Baccalaureate, and/or Cambridge tests taken by all students at a school in 2006 divided by the number of graduating seniors."

The school was ranked in 58th place nationwide in Newsweek's May 8, 2006 issue, listing the Top 1,200 High Schools in The United States. Pittsford Mendon High School was ranked as Number 39 in the United States in Newsweek's 2005 survey.

Academics
Mendon offers a variety of courses, with numerous Advanced Placement (AP) courses in Science, English, Social Studies, Math, Art, Foreign Language, and Music. Mendon's Foreign Language selection includes Spanish, French, and Latin.

Notable alumni

 Avram Glazer, Chairman of Manchester United
 Tyson Beckford, supermodel, actor.
 Nicole Fiscella, actress, noted for her role as Isabel Coates on Gossip Girl
 Stephen Gilfus, Founder of Blackboard Inc.; President and CEO Gilfus Education Group. 
 Kaitlin Monte, actress, Miss New York 2011 
 James Satloff, Investment bank CEO, Internet company CEO, Ski Company CEO
 Joy Tanner, Actress, noted for her role as Nora MacDonald on Disney's Life with Derek
 Steve Toth, member of the Texas House of Representatives from The Woodlands in suburban Houston.
 Danny Mendick, Baseball player for the New York Mets.

Feeder patterns
Park Road Elementary School, Thornell Road Elementary School, and the southern part of Mendon Center Elementary School feed into Barker Road Middle School, then to Pittsford Mendon High School. There is also a City-Suburban program, which sees over 50 students transferred from Rochester City Schools, to Mendon High School, and Barker Road Middle School.

References

External links
Pittsford Mendon High School website

High schools in Monroe County, New York
Public high schools in New York (state)